The Kararname of 1296 (Turkish: Meskûkât-ı Osmaniye Kararnamesi ), was a decree concerning monetary systems of the Ottoman Empire. This kararname established a bimetallic currency system based on gold and silver in the year 1296 AH (1880 AD).

Etymology

Kararname is a word from the Turkish language, meaning a government decree.

References

External links
Zvi Yehuda Hershlag, Introduction to the Modern Economic History of the Middle East, Brill Archive, 1980, p. 62.
United States. Bureau of the Mint, Annual Report of the Director of the Mint, Department of the Treasury, Bureau of the Mint, 1916, p. 177.
Osman Okyar, Halil İnalcık (ed.), Türkiye'nin Sosyal ve Ekonomik Tarihi (1071-1920): Birinci Uluslararası Türkiye'nin Sosyal ve Ekonomik Tarihi Kongresi Tebliğleri, Meteksan, 1980, p. 304.

Economy of the Ottoman Empire
Metallism
Monetary reform
Ottoman law
1880 in the Ottoman Empire
1880 in economics